Team Europe may refer to a number of sports team using the designate to represent a unified team of European countries in sporting competitions. Whilst neither the European Union nor the Council of Europe are countries themselves, European teams have been formed to compete in several international competitions. The most famous of these is the Ryder Cup in golf which sees a European team play against a team from the USA in even-numbered years. In association football, a selection of European footballers play occasionally for charity games and anniversary games in the Europe XI team.

Team Europe may also refer to cooperative efforts between the European Union, its Member States, the European Investment Bank, and the European Bank for Reconstruction and Development. Team Europe was created in response to the COVID-19 pandemic to improve coherence and coordination between its members.

Examples of competitions featuring a European team
"Team Europe" is the official designation of the team representing Europe in several international competitions

Europe vs. USA
Ryder Cup — Biennial men's professional golf event
Solheim Cup — Biennial women's professional golf event
Arnold Palmer Cup — Annual men's amateur golf event featuring college/university players. "Team Europe" was replaced by an "International Team", representing all non-US nationalities, starting in 2018.
Mosconi Cup — Annual Nine-ball pool competition
Weber Cup — Annual Ten-pin bowling competition

Europe vs. Asia
EurAsia Cup — Biennial men's professional golf event
Royal Trophy — Defunct men's professional golf event from 2006 to 2013, replaced by the EurAsia Cup.
Bonallack Trophy — Biennial men's amateur golf event (Team Europe vs. Team Asia/Pacific)
Euro-Asia Cup — Table tennis

Other
Fightmaster Cup — Biennial golf event involving players with the use of one arm only (Team Europe vs. Team North America)
Continental Cup of Curling — Curling
IAAF World Cup — Athletics
Laver Cup — Tennis (Team Europe vs Team World)
NFL Global Junior Championship — American football
2016 World Cup of Hockey (team) — Ice hockey

Note that in the above sports there also exist national teams taking part in other competitions.

Junior Events
Junior Ryder Cup — Biennial golf event based on the Ryder Cup
Junior Solheim Cup — Biennial golf event for girls aged 12 to 18, based on the Solheim Cup

Competitions featuring a Europe team

Note that in the above sports there also exist national teams taking part in other competitions

Other examples of "Team Europe"

See also
 Team North America
 World team

References

Sport in Europe
Multinational sports teams